Chan Chung Wang (Chinese: 陳仲泓; born 10 June 1991) is a Hong Kong track and field athlete. He was named the best male athlete in Hong Kong in 2019. Chan competed in the 2020 Summer Olympics in Tokyo in the men's 110 meter hurdles.

References

External links
Chan Chung Wang at Eurosport

1991 births
Living people
Hong Kong male hurdlers
Olympic athletes of Hong Kong
Athletes (track and field) at the 2020 Summer Olympics
Asian Games competitors for Hong Kong
Athletes (track and field) at the 2018 Asian Games